Cherry Hill Fountain is a water fountain in New York City's Central Park. It is located just to the west of Bethesda Fountain, enclosed in a circular plaza in Cherry Hill. Designed by Jacob Wrey Mould and dedicated in the 1860s, the ornamental structure was originally designed as a watering trough for horses during the 19th century. The fountain is topped by a finial with eight frosted round glass lamps and a golden spire. Only the stone base was completed as part of the original design; the finial was added in 1981.

In 1998, with funds donated by Elizabeth and Clement Moore, the Central Park Conservancy restored the fountain to working condition. Cherry Hill, includingtis fountain, was closed for another renovation in 2011, and it reopened the following year.

The fountain is often mistaken by park visitors for one used in the opening theme of the television show Friends, on the Warner Bros. Ranch Lot in Burbank, California.

References

External links
 
 New York Focus - Central Park 2009

Fountains in New York City
Central Park
1860s establishments in New York (state)
1860s architecture in the United States